The men's 1000 metres races of the 2013–14 ISU Speed Skating World Cup 6, arranged in the Thialf arena, in Heerenveen, Netherlands, was held on 14 March 2014.

Denny Morrison of Canada won the race, while Shani Davis of the United States came second, and Kjeld Nuis of the Netherlands came third.

Result
The race took place on Friday, 14 March, scheduled at 17:12.

Division A

References

Men 1000
6